The Journal of Central European Agriculture (JCEA) is an Open access peer-reviewed scientific journal founded in 1999 by three faculties from Croatia, Hungary and Slovakia. Today, JCEA is a product of cooperation from nine central European member countries.

Topics covered in JCEA include all areas in field of Agriculture with special attention on landscape management, wildlife management and agro-economy. Journal publishes articles in English language or the member state national language with obligatory title and abstract in English language.

External links 
 
 JCEA publishers page

References 

Agricultural journals
Open access journals
Multilingual journals
Quarterly journals
Publications established in 1999